Nocardioides echinoideorum is a Gram-positive, aerobic, rod-shaped and non-motil bacterium from the genus Nocardioides which has been isolated from the sea urchin Tripneustes gratilla near Penghu Island, Taiwan.

References 

echinoideorum
Bacteria described in 2015